Dominik Tarczyński (born March 27, 1979, in Lublin) is a Polish politician and journalist who was previously a member of the Sejm and has been a member of the European Parliament since 2020.

Biography 
From 2003 to 2008, he was a community animator at London's Westminster Cathedral, and hosted a radio broadcast of Christian music. He was a lay assistant to one of the British exorcists. From January 23, 2009, to February 1, 2010, he was the director of TVP3 Kielce; later, he was employed as the deputy director for operation in the IT and Telecommunications Center of TVP.

He also took up journalistic activity in the pages of "Gazeta Polska" and created documentary films devoted, among other topics, to the activities of exorcists. He directed the documentary film Colombia - Testimony to the World, with the participation of the then-president of Colombia, Álvaro Uribe, which received an award at the Sixteenth International Catholic Film and Multimedia Festival in Niepokalanów. He was the founder of the Association of Catholics Charismatics.

In 2010, he unsuccessfully ran for the Świętokrzyskie Sejm from the Law and Justice list. Then he organized the structures of the Poland Is Most Important Association in Kielce, but after a few weeks he left it. In 2011, he co-founded Solidarna Polska, which he left at the beginning of April 2014. In the same year, on the recommendation of the Right hand of the Republic of Poland, he again ran for the regional council from the PiS list. In the parliamentary elections in 2015, he ran to the Sejm as a non-party candidate from the eleventh place on the Law and Justice list in the Kielce district. He was elected MP for the 8th term of office, receiving 7,475 votes. After the elections, he became a member of PiS.

In October 2018, he lost a lawsuit filed by Bogdan Wenta, who was running for the presidency of Kielce. In a decision upheld by the Court of Appeal in Kraków, the District Court of Kielce ordered him to correct and stop disseminating untrue information about Wenta's alleged service in ZOMO and about him "training on the heads of Poles." He was also ordered to issue an apology and a payment of PLN 20,000 PLN for the Great Orchestra of Christmas Charity.

In the 2019 European Parliament elections, he was elected deputy of the ninth term. He received an additional mandate in the European Parliament, granted to Poland as part of the distribution of some of the mandates previously filled by Great Britain. However, due to the delay in the Brexit procedure, this mandate was suspended.

In the Polish parliamentary election of the same year, he was again elected to the Sejm, receiving 8,186 votes. On February 1, 2020, after Brexit took effect, he was seated as a member of the Ninth European Parliament.

References

External links

Law and Justice MEPs
Polish anti-communists
Polish nationalists
MEPs for Poland 2019–2024
1979 births
Living people
Politicians from Lublin